A discordant coastline occurs where bands of different rock types run perpendicular to the coast.

The differing resistance to erosion leads to the formation of headlands and bays. A hard rock type such as granite is resistant to erosion and creates a promontory whilst a softer rock type such as the clays of Bagshot Beds is easily eroded creating a bay.

Part of the Dorset coastline running north from the Portland limestone of Durlston Head is a clear example of a discordant coastline. The Portland limestone is resistant to erosion; then to the north there is a bay at Swanage where the rock type is a softer greensand. North of Swanage, the chalk outcrop creates the headland which includes Old Harry Rocks.

The converse of a discordant coastline is a concordant coastline.

Examples
The coastline around Durlston Bay is an example of a discordant coastline.

See also
Concordant coastline

Coastal geography